The Spokane Indians are a Minor League Baseball team located in Spokane Valley, the city immediately east of Spokane, Washington, in the Pacific Northwest. The Indians are members of the High-A Northwest League (NWL) as an affiliate of the Colorado Rockies. Spokane plays its home games at Avista Stadium, which opened in 1958 and has a seating capacity of 6,752.

From 1958 through 1982, excluding 1972, the Indians were in the Triple-A Pacific Coast League (PCL). They were members of the Class A Short Season Northwest League from 1955 to 1956, in 1972, and from 1983 to 2020. The NWL operated as the High-A West in 2021 and was elevated to the High-A level. They have won 12 league titles: four in the PCL and eight in the NWL. The Spokane region has over a century of history in Minor League Baseball, dating back to the 1890s.

History

Before 1958

Spokane's minor league history dates to 1892, when it fielded a team in the Pacific Northwest League. The nickname Indians dates to 1903, when Spokane joined the Pacific National League, a predecessor to the Pacific Coast League and, at Class A, an elite minor league of the period, equivalent to Triple-A today. The Indians lasted only two seasons at that higher level before dropping to the Class B Northwestern League, which folded during World War I.

In 1937, Spokane became a charter member of the Class B Western International League (WIL), the predecessor of the Northwest League. They played at Ferris Field from 1937 through 1942 and 1946 until folding during the 1954 season on June 21.

Spokane was a charter member of the Northwest League, which debuted in 1955 as a Class B league. These Indians also played at Ferris Field, but folded after just two seasons, and the city went without minor league baseball in 1957.

The 1946 Spokane bus tragedy
In 1946, the WIL Indians were victims of the worst transit accident in the history of American professional sport. On June 24, the team was on its way west to Bremerton by bus to play the Bluejackets. While crossing the Cascade Mountains on a rain-slickened Snoqualmie Pass Highway (then U.S. Route 10), the bus driver swerved to avoid an oncoming car. The Indians' vehicle veered off the road and down an embankment, then crashed and burst into flames.

Nine men died—six of them instantly—and seven were injured. The dead were catcher/manager Mel Cole (age 32), pitchers Bob Kinnaman (28) and George Lyden (23), catcher Chris Hartje (31), infielders Fred Martinez (24), Vic Picetti (18) and George Risk (25), and outfielders Bob James (25) and Bob Paterson (23). Despite a severe head wound, infielder Ben Geraghty was able to struggle back up the mountainside to signal for help. Injured survivors also included pitchers Pete Barisoff, Gus Hallbourg and Dick Powers, catcher Irv Konopka, outfielder Levi McCormack, and bus driver Glen Berg.

One player from the 1946 team, future major league infielder Jack "Lucky" Lohrke, missed the tragedy because his contract was sold to the PCL San Diego Padres on June 24 and he departed the ill-fated bus during a late lunch stop in Ellensburg, not long before the accident, thus helping to earn his nickname. (Lohrke had previously averted tragedy when he was bumped from a military transport plane which later crashed.) Two Indians' pitchers, Milt Cadinha and Joe Faria, were making the trip to Bremerton by automobile and were not aboard the team bus when it crashed.

The Indians, relying on players loaned from other teams, managed to finish the season and placed seventh in the league. A special charity, the Spokane Baseball Benefit Association, donated $114,800 to the injured survivors and dependents of the nine players who died.

Beth Bollinger of Spokane wrote a novel titled Until the End of the Ninth, which is based on the true story of the 1946 bus crash and its aftermath.

Pacific Coast League (1958–1971, 1973–1982)

When the Los Angeles Dodgers moved from Brooklyn to the west coast in 1958, they moved their PCL affiliate, the Los Angeles Angels, north to Spokane. While with the Dodgers for 14 seasons, the Indians won league titles in 1960 and 1970, and were runners-up in 1963, 1967, and 1968.

The 1970 Indians, managed by Tommy Lasorda, won 94 of 146 games in the regular season to win the northern division by 26 games, then swept the Hawaii Islanders in four games in the PCL playoffs. The team included Bill Buckner, Steve Garvey, Bobby Valentine (PCL MVP), Tom Paciorek, Davey Lopes, Bill Russell, and Doyle Alexander.

Following the 1971 season, the club was moved south to New Mexico and became the Albuquerque Dukes. Spokane, which had been in the Northwest League for its first two seasons in 1955 and 1956, returned to the NWL in 1972 as a Dodger affiliate, but only for one season, as a new PCL franchise arrived in 1973 from Portland, becoming the affiliate of the Texas Rangers. The 1973 team, which included Bill Madlock and Lenny Randle, won the west division by eleven games and swept Tucson in three games in the championship series. The following year's club successfully defended the title with another three-game sweep, this time over Albuquerque.

The Indians' second stint in Triple-A lasted ten seasons and included affiliations with the Rangers, which changed to the Milwaukee Brewers in 1976, Seattle Mariners in 1979, and California Angels in 1982. Taking their first division crown since 1974, the Indians defeated Tacoma in the first round, but fell to Albuquerque in the championship series in six games. Soon after that season, the team moved south to Las Vegas and became the Stars. The team's general manager was Larry Koentopp, former head coach and athletic director at Gonzaga. He was the leader of a local ownership group that purchased the team after the 1978 season. The team was purchased for $259,000 in 1978 and was sold in 1993 for $6.1 million.

Northwest League (1983–2020)

A new NWL franchise was awarded to Spokane for the 1983 season and the Indians have won eight league titles; the first four were consecutive, from 1987 through 1990. The Indians won their seventh NWL championship in 2005, despite a 37–39 record during the regular season. They became only the second team in league history (after the 1982 Salem Angels) to win the championship with a losing regular season record. Spokane won the east division, then beat league-leading Vancouver on the road in games four and five of the championship series to win the title.

In 2008, the Indians captured their eighth league title with a thrilling four-game series victory over the Salem-Keizer Volcanoes. After dropping the first game, Spokane rallied to an 11–10 win in 10 innings to even the series. In game three, the Indians fell behind 10–2 before rallying for nine unanswered runs to win again 11–10. Spokane won the title with a 6–5 victory in 10 innings in the fourth game.

The Indians were featured in the "Spokane Alphabet" reverse glass painting by Washington artist Melinda Curtin. They were the "I" in the alphabet, cementing their place as an important part of the city of Spokane.

Following the 1985 season, the team was bought by the Brett brothers (John, Ken, Bobby, and George).

High-A West and back to the Northwest League (2021–present)
In conjunction with Major League Baseball's restructuring of Minor League Baseball in 2021, the Indians were organized into the High-A West along with five other teams previously of the Northwest League. They qualified for the playoffs by finishing with a second-place 67–49 record, but they were defeated by the Eugene Emeralds, 3–1, in the best-of-five championship series. The franchise was recognized with the Minor League Baseball Organization of the Year Award.

The High-A West was rebranded back to the Northwest League in March 2022 as MLB moved to revert all of its minor leagues to their historical names.

Playoffs
1987: Defeated Everett 2–1 to win championship
1988: Defeated Southern Oregon 2–1 to win championship
1989: Defeated Southern Oregon 2–1 to win championship
1990: Defeated Boise 2–1 to win championship
1999: Defeated Portland 3–0 to win championship
2003: Defeated Salem-Keizer 3–0 to win championship
2005: Defeated Vancouver 3–2 to win championship
2008: Defeated Salem-Keizer 3–1 to win championship
2010: Defeated Yakima 2–0 in semifinals; lost to Everett 2–1 in finals
2018: Defeated Everett 2–1 in semifinals; lost to Eugene 3–0 in finals
2019: Lost to Tri-City 2–1 in semifinals
2021: Lost to Eugene 3–1 in finals

Logos and uniforms

The team's colors are red, navy blue, light blue, and beige. In the 2006 offseason, the Indians began a process to redesign their logo and uniforms. As per tradition, they began by avoiding the use of any American Indian imagery, but early in the process, the Spokane Nation contacted the team about officially supporting the team. In the process, the tribe gave permission to the team to adopt subtle and tasteful imagery, in order to pay homage to the team's history and new connection with the tribe. The cooperation included the creation of a secondary logo written in Salish, the traditional language of the Spokane.

Roster

Notable alumni

Baseball Hall of Fame alumni
 Tommy Lasorda (1969–1971, manager) inducted 1997
 Duke Snider (1965, manager) inducted 1980
 Don Sutton (1968) inducted 1998
 Hoyt Wilhelm (1971) inducted 1985

Notable alumni
 Sandy Alomar Jr. (1984) 1990 MLB Rookie of the Year; 6-time MLB All Star 
 Carlos Beltrán (1996) 1999 AL Rookie of the Year; 9-time MLB All Star
 Bruce Bochy (1989, manager) Manager: 3-time World Series Champion – San Francisco Giants (2010, 2012, 2014)
 Bill Buckner (1969–1970) MLB All-Star; 1982 NL batting title
 Dolph Camilli (1948, manager) 2-time MLB All-Star; 1941, NL Most Valuable Player
 Ron Cey (1971) 6-time MLB All-Star
 Gino Cimoli (1965) MLB All-Star
 Matt Clement (1994) MLB All-Star
 Joey Cora (1985) MLB All-Star
 Roger Craig (1959)
 Chris Davis (2006) MLB All-Star; MLB home run leader: 2013, 2015
 Willie Davis (1960) 2 Time MLB All-Star; (1960) Minor League MVP
 Ron Fairly (1960) 2 Time MLB All-Star
 Neftalí Feliz, MLB All-Star
 Steve Garvey (1970) 10-time MLB All-Star; 1974 NL Most Valuable Player
 Zack Greinke (2002) 2009 AL Cy Young Award; 4-time MLB All-Star
 Brad Gulden
 Ian Kinsler (2003) 4-time MLB All Star
 Davey Lopes (1971) 4-time MLB All-Star
 Gary Matthews Jr. (1994) MLB All-Star
 Tony Mullane (1902) 
 Don Newcombe (1961) 4-time MLB All-Star; 1949 NL Rookie of the Year; 1956 NL Cy Young Award; 1956 NL Most Valuable Player
 Gorman Thomas (1972) MLB All-Star
 Roy White (1967) 2-time MLB All-Star
 Mitch Williams (1983) MLB All-Star
 Maury Wills (1959) 7-time MLB All-Star; 1962 NL Most Valuable Player
 Ned Yost (1978) manager: 2015 World Series Champion – Kansas City Royals

See also
Spokane Indians players
Spokane Hawks players (1937–1940)

References

External links

Statistics from Baseball-Reference
Until the End of the Ninth
The Last Survivor – Interview with Gus Hallbourg about the 1946 bus crash

Colorado Rockies minor league affiliates
Brooklyn Dodgers minor league affiliates
California Angels minor league affiliates
Defunct Pacific Coast League teams
Kansas City Royals minor league affiliates
Los Angeles Dodgers minor league affiliates
Milwaukee Brewers minor league affiliates
Northwest League teams
Philadelphia Phillies minor league affiliates
Professional baseball teams in Washington (state)
San Diego Padres minor league affiliates
Seattle Mariners minor league affiliates
Baseball teams established in 1898
Sports in Spokane, Washington
Texas Rangers minor league affiliates
1898 establishments in Washington (state)
High-A West teams